Brian Hurst may refer to:

 Brian Desmond Hurst (1895–1986), film director
 Brian Seth Hurst, executive producer of Bunim Murray Digital